Kfaraakka also spelled Kferaakka is a village in the Koura District of Lebanon. It covers an area of 5.6 million square meters with an estimated population of 3,500. 

Kfaraakka produces and exports the most olive oil in Lebanon. It is about 350 meters above sea level, It has two hills: Mar Youhanna Hill, and Mar Nohra Hill. It is 17 kilometres from the coastal city of Tripoli and 11 kilometres from Chekka.

Etymology
The village of Kfaraakka derives its name from the Aramaic language, composed of two words: Kafar and Aka. “Kafar” means village and "Aka" means sorrow, so the meaning of Kfaraakka is the village of sadness, gloom and distress.

Demographics
Kfaraakka is a pro Greek Orthodox village with a small Maronite community.

Education
There are two official complementary schools in Kfaraakka, one for males and one for females, a mixed public high school, a private professional institute (Freddy Atallah - IFA) and a branch of the American University for Culture and Education (AUCE).

Street names
as of 2017, Kfaraakka has 10 named streets

Al Biyad
Al Seha
Al Matriyeh
Al Ramieh
Dahr Al Mazraa
Fouk Al Bir
Mar Nohra
Mar Youhanna
Tahta
Talaa

Notable residents

Philippe Najib Boulos

References

External links
Kfar Aaqqa, Localiban
The municipality of Kafaraka 

Eastern Orthodox Christian communities in Lebanon
Populated places in the North Governorate
Koura District
Maronite Christian communities in Lebanon